Mihrak was a Parthian dynast, who was the ruler of Abarsas and Jahrom in the early 3rd-century. He was the son of Anoshagzatan, and belonged to a family which traced their descent back to the Kayanids. He was defeated and killed in ca. 222 during a clash with the first Sasanian king Ardashir I (r. 224-242). Mihrak had a daughter named Gurdzad, who later married Ardashir's son Shapur and bore him Hormizd.

Sources 
 

 
 

3rd-century Iranian people
History of Fars Province
Monarchs killed in action
3rd-century monarchs in the Middle East
Vassal rulers of the Parthian Empire
222 deaths
Year of birth unknown